Diocese of Valparaíso may refer to the following ecclesiastical jurisdictions in Chile:
 Roman Catholic Diocese of Valparaíso
 Anglican Diocese of Valparaíso